Symbio-City, also known as Centurion Symbio-City, is a proposed skyscraper in Centurion, Gauteng, South Africa. At , it will be the tallest building in Africa, if built. Plans consist of 3 buildings, the largest built over Centurion lake.

References

Residential skyscrapers in South Africa